Ruben Orozco (born 1917) was a Uruguayan modern pentathlete. He competed at the 1948 Summer Olympics.

References

External links
 

1917 births
Possibly living people
Uruguayan male modern pentathletes
Olympic modern pentathletes of Uruguay
Modern pentathletes at the 1948 Summer Olympics